The Argentine hocicudo (Oxymycterus akodontius) is a species of rodent in the family Cricetidae. It is found only in northern Argentina in yungas (eastern Andean mountain forest) habitat. The exact population is unknown as only three specimens have been collected and threats may be deforestation and overgrazing although the exact effects are unknown. Some authorities consider it to be conspecific with Oxymycterus paramensis, while others consider it distinct.

References

Mammals of Argentina
Oxymycterus
Mammals described in 1921
Taxa named by Oldfield Thomas
Taxonomy articles created by Polbot
Taxobox binomials not recognized by IUCN